Druhé mládí is a 1938 Czechoslovak film. The film starred Josef Kemr.

References

External links
 

1938 films
1930s Czech-language films
Czech musical drama films
Czechoslovak black-and-white films
1930s musical drama films
Czechoslovak musical drama films
1938 drama films
1930s Czech films